Puchezhsky District is an administrative and municipal district (raion), one of the twenty-one in Ivanovo Oblast, Russia. It is located in the east of the oblast. Its administrative center is the town of Puchezh. Population:   17,490 (2002 Census);  The population of Puchezh accounts for 62.2% of the district's total population.

Administrative and municipal status
The town of Puchezh serves as the administrative center of the district. Prior to the adoption of the Law #145-OZ On the Administrative-Territorial Division of Ivanovo Oblast in December 2010, it was administratively incorporated separately from the district.  Municipally, Puchezh is incorporated within Puchezhsky Municipal District as Puchezhskoye Urban Settlement.

References

Notes

Sources

Districts of Ivanovo Oblast

